The Ministry of Women and Children Affairs (Mahilā ō śiśu biṣaẏaka mantraṇālaẏa) is the government ministry of Bangladesh responsible for the formulation of policies that promote the institutionalization and development of women and children issues.

Directorates
Department of Women Affairs
Jatiya Mohila Songstha
Bangladesh Shishu Academy
Joyeeta Foundation
DNA Laboratory Directorate

References

 
Women and Children Affairs
Women in Bangladesh
Women's rights in Bangladesh
Bangladesh
Bangladesh